was a district located at Kii Province.

Muro District was the largest district located at the southwestern Kii Peninsula and covered half of Kii Province, but in 1879, the district split off into Kitamuro and Minamimuro Districts in Mie Prefecture and Higashimuro and Nishimuro Districts in Wakayama Prefecture.

Former districts of Mie Prefecture
Former districts of Wakayama Prefecture